Maxwell Charles Rainsford (born 25 December 1962) is an Australian former cyclist. He competed in the sprint and 1000m time trial events at the 1984 Summer Olympics.

References

External links
 

1962 births
Living people
Australian male cyclists
Olympic cyclists of Australia
Cyclists at the 1984 Summer Olympics
Place of birth missing (living people)
Commonwealth Games medallists in cycling
Commonwealth Games bronze medallists for Australia
Cyclists at the 1986 Commonwealth Games
Medallists at the 1986 Commonwealth Games